Protaeolidiella atra is a species of sea slug, an aeolid nudibranch, a marine gastropod mollusc in the family Pleurolidiidae.

Taxonomic history
This species was synonymised with Pleurolidia juliae by Rudman. A careful study by Carmona et al. using DNA sequencing showed that these were really two sister species and that they were not members of the family Aeolidiidae.

Distribution
This species was described from Kasajima, Sagami Bay, Japan. It is also known from Korea.

Description
Protaeolidiella atra is an aeolid nudibranch with a burgundy to black coloured body and numerous cerata with white tips. It is confused with Pleurolidia juliae in many works but can be distinguished by the lack of a dorsal white line on the body and more numerous, ungrouped cerata.

References

Pleurolidiidae
Gastropods described in 1966